The animated series Scooby-Doo has been adapted and appeared in five feature-length films since its debut in 1969, not including the series of animated direct-to-video films that have been in production since 1998, or the four animated television films produced from 1987 to 1994.

Toward the end of the 1990s, Warner Bros. and producer Charles Roven began producing a series of feature live-action films starring Scooby-Doo, beginning with the 2002 film Scooby-Doo, directed by Raja Gosnell. Gosnell also directed the 2004 sequel Scooby-Doo 2: Monsters Unleashed (2004). A reboot television film, Scooby-Doo! The Mystery Begins (2009), was released by Cartoon Network. Brian Levant directed the film and its sequel, Scooby-Doo! Curse of the Lake Monster (2010). A direct-to-video film entitled Daphne & Velma, with no connection to previous Scooby-Doo films, was released in 2018. An animated film titled Scoob! was scheduled for release in theaters on May 15, 2020, but was released direct-to-video on digital platforms due to COVID-19 closing most theaters in the United States and Canada. The film subsequently received a secondary theatrical release in the United States beginning on May 21, 2021 in selected markets. In December 2021, HBO Max confirmed the development of a further prequel film, Scoob! Holiday Haunt, the release of which was cancelled by Warner Bros. Discovery in August 2022, citing cost-cutting measures and a refocus on theatrical films rather than creating projects for streaming, despite the film already being completed.

Background
Development for a live-action treatment of Scooby-Doo began in 1994 by producer Charles Roven. Originally the idea was to make a film with a much darker tone, essentially poking fun at the original cartoon series, much like The Brady Bunch Movie and was set for a PG-13 rating. Shaggy was set to be a stoner, Velma and Daphne had a side relationship,  and there were many  marijuana references.

Several rumors about these aspects in the original cartoon series were passed around by fans of Scooby-Doo, and were to be incorporated into the live action film.

Live-action theatrical films

Scooby-Doo (2002)

Scooby-Doo was released on June 14, 2002. Directed by Raja Gosnell, the film starred Freddie Prinze Jr., as Fred, Sarah Michelle Gellar as Daphne, Matthew Lillard as Shaggy, and Linda Cardellini as Velma. Scooby-Doo was created on-screen by computer-generated special effects and his voice was provided by Neil Fanning.

The plot shows the Mystery, Inc. coming back together after two years of separation, to investigate an amusement park called Spooky Island, where they deal with real demons.

The film was a financially successful release, with a domestic box office gross of over $130 million. However, the film was not well reviewed, but was a great hit with young audiences and fans of the show.

Scooby-Doo 2: Monsters Unleashed (2004)

Scooby-Doo 2: Monsters Unleashed was released on March 26, 2004, with the same cast and director from the first film.

The plot shows the Mystery Inc. investigating the plans of a masked villain who wants to control the city of Coolsville using a machine to create monsters. Unlike the first film, Scooby-Doo 2 featured several of the monsters from the television series, including the Black Knight, the 10,000-Volt Ghost, the Pterodactyl Ghost, the Miner 49er, Captain Cutler and the Tar Monster.

The film had a poor performance at the box office, grossing $80 million at the U.S. Scooby-Doo 2 was nominated for a Razzie Award for "Worst Remake or Sequel".

Live-action TV films

Scooby-Doo! The Mystery Begins (2009)

Scooby-Doo! The Mystery Begins was aired by Cartoon Network on September 13, 2009, the 40th anniversary of Scooby-Doo. It was released on DVD and Blu-ray on September 22. Directed by Brian Levant, the plot is an origin story for the Mystery, Inc. gang, portraying the beginning of everything: how the gang met, their first mystery, their lives at school and how they got the Mystery Machine.

Scooby-Doo! Curse of the Lake Monster (2010)

Scooby-Doo! Curse of the Lake Monster was aired by Cartoon Network
on October 16, 2010, with the same director and cast from the previous film. In this film, the Mystery, Inc. gang is heading
towards a beach club owned by Daphne's uncle, for temporary summer jobs. While involved with their tasks, they stumble on a new mystery.

Live-action direct-to-video film

Daphne & Velma (2018)

Daphne & Velma was released on DVD on May 22, 2018. Directed by Suzi Yoonessi, it features the title characters Daphne Blake and Velma Dinkley. The plot shows Daphne and Velma investigating mysteries in their high school. Sarah Jeffery and Sarah Gilman portray Daphne and Velma, respectively.

Animated theatrical films

Scoob! (2020)

Scooby-Doo is the hero of his own story in Scoob!, the first full-length, animated film, which reveals how he and his best friend Shaggy became two of the world's most beloved crime busters. The story takes us back to where it all began, when a young Scooby and Shaggy first meet, and team up with Velma, Daphne, and Fred to launch Mystery Incorporated.

Scoob! Holiday Haunt (unreleased)
In June 2021, Cervone said that a sequel to Scoob! was in development. On December 22, 2021, HBO Max released a sizzle reel featuring a first look at a Christmas-themed prequel film, titled Scoob! Holiday Haunt, which was to be released on the service in December 2022. The film takes place in the gang's youth, with Welker and the actors who portrayed the younger versions reprising their roles while Cervone returned to write the film with Paul Dini as well to produce the project. The film was co-directed by Bill Haller and Michael Kurinsky, and had a production budget of $40 million. On August 2, 2022, Warner Bros. Discovery canceled its release, citing cost-cutting measures and a refocus on theatrical films rather than creating projects for streaming. Tony Cervone would go on to say on the same day that the project was "practically finished". Later that month, it was reported that the film would still be finished, even though Warner Bros. Discovery had no present plans to release it. The film was finally finished on November 4, 2022.

Limited theatrical animated films

Scooby-Doo! in Where's My Mummy? (2005)

The film had a limited theatrical release in the United States on May 13, 2005.

Scooby-Doo! Stage Fright (2013)

The film had a limited theatrical release in the United States on August 20, 2013.

Scooby-Doo! & Batman: The Brave and the Bold (2018)

The film was premiered at the TCL Chinese Theatre on January 6, 2018.

Cast and crew

Cast

 A dark gray cell indicates the character did not appear in that installment.
 An  indicates a performance through archived or previous work.
 A  indicates a performance through voice-over work.
 A  indicates an actor or actress voiced a younger version of their character.

Crew

Reception

Box office performance

Critical and public response

Cancelled projects
In October 2002, during the filming of Scooby-Doo 2, Warner Bros. gave the green light for production of a third film. Dan Forman and Paul Foley were hired to write the script for Scooby-Doo 3. In August 2004, Matthew Lillard said in an interview that the third Scooby-Doo film was cancelled. "There will be no Scooby 3," Lillard said. "The second one didn't do as well as it was expected to do, and I completely hold that to Warner Brothers' fault. I think Warner Brothers made a mistake releasing it at the time they did March 2004. I think the movie's much better than the first movie, and I honestly thought it was going to do ridiculously good box office. But we had a bad timeslot. We had 13 movies open up in two weeks after we opened up. I mean, it did well, but it didn't do great, and it needed to do great", added, noting that the studio was quite disappointed with the result, which prevented the production of a third film.

References

 
Adventure film series
Children's film series
Comedy film franchises
Warner Bros. Pictures franchises
American fantasy adventure films
Fantasy film series
Film series introduced in 2002